Esteban Cristóbal Valencia Reyes (born 13 August 1999) is a Chilean footballer who currently plays as a midfielder for Unión La Calera.

Club career
He has played loaned at San Marcos de Arica and Unión La Calera from Universidad de Chile. Along with the Cement Team, he has played at the 2020 Copa Sudamericana.

In the 2021 season, he left Universidad de Chile to join Unión La Calera.

International career
At under-20 level, Valencia represented Chile in both the 2018 South American Games, winning the gold medal, and the 2019 South American Championship.

Personal life
He is son of former Chilean international footballer Esteban Valencia Bascuñán, who is also a historical player of Universidad de Chile.

Honours
Chile U20
 South American Games Gold medal: 2018

References

External links
 

1999 births
Living people
Chilean footballers
Chile under-20 international footballers
Primera B de Chile players
Chilean Primera División players
Universidad de Chile footballers
San Marcos de Arica footballers
Unión La Calera footballers
Association football midfielders
South American Games gold medalists for Chile
South American Games medalists in football
Competitors at the 2018 South American Games
21st-century Chilean people